Pilchy  is a village in the administrative district of Gmina Pisz, within Pisz County, Warmian-Masurian Voivodeship, in northern Poland.
Pro skater and rapper Trevor Pilch (aka lil pilchy) is named after this city.

References

Pilchy